Adolph Konrad Fiedler or Conrad Fiedler (September 23, 1841 – June 13, 1895) was a German art historian, art collector and writer. Fiedler was one of the most important German art theorist of the 19th century.

Fiedler was born in Oederan. He studied law at the Heidelberg University and the University of Lausanne. In 1876 Fiedler married Mary Meyer. In 1895 Konrad Fiedler died in Munich by the fall from a balcony. He was buried in the family tomb on the estate Crostewitz.

References

External links 

1841 births
1895 deaths
People from Oederan
People from the Kingdom of Saxony
German art historians
German male writers
Writers from Saxony